Vörösmarty tér or Vörösmarty square is a public square in the Budapest city centre at the northern end of Váci utca.

At the centre of the square facing west is a statue by Eduard Telcs and Ede Kallós of poet Mihály Vörösmarty. Behind the monument is a fenced park and a fountain flanked by stone lions. At the north end of the square is the Café Gerbeaud and stairs to the southern terminus of the Budapest Metro's venerable yellow line (M1). The square is also a business area, including offices for Ibusz and Aeroflot. The British Embassy is located at the square.

Names
The square has held many names since it was created. In 1812, it was called  (because of the theatre formerly located there). In 1846, it was called  (German Theatre Square), changed to just  in 1850, and then  (Old Theatre Square) in 1866. In 1874, it was named  (in honour of Archduchess Gisela of Austria), then briefly  between 1918 and 1920, then  again until 1926 when it gained its current name. Today, a column in the square lists all its former names.

References

Squares in Budapest